Dendragama schneideri, Schneider's tree agama,  is a species of lizard in the family Agamidae. It is endemic to Sumatra.

References

Dendragama
Reptiles of Indonesia
Endemic fauna of Sumatra
Reptiles described in 1926
Taxa named by Ernst Ahl